General Bacon may refer to:

Anthony Bacon (British Army officer) (1796–1864), British Army major general
Don Bacon (born 1963), U.S. Air Force brigadier general
John M. Bacon (1844–1913), U.S. Volunteers brigadier general